The Crescent Theater is a single-screen movie theater located in Mobile, Alabama. The theater mainly shows independent and arthouse cinema, though several mainstream films have been included. It also operates as the home of local cinema and film competitions, and has been used for music and improvisational comedy. It was first opened in 1885 as the Crescent Theater for vaudeville entertainment. In the intervening years, the building became a cinema and later was used for restaurants, before being reopened in October 2008 by Max Morey, the theater's owner and operator.

Background
The Crescent Theater first opened at 208 Dauphin Street in Mobile in 1885, offering vaudeville and burlesque shows. In 1912, it was converted to show silent films. In the late 20th century, the building was used for several restaurants, and by 2006, it was operating as Derry's Ole Tyme Cafe. It suffered damage that year when a neighboring bar, Monsoon's, caught fire.

The building was later rented to Max Morey, who reopened as the Crescent Theater on October 31, 2008. Morey had first visited the city in 1992 and, according to the Press-Register, "vowed that he was going to save his money and build a movie theater there." The theater was successful, and has been credited with revitalizing downtown Mobile. In 2012, it nearly shuttered when costs mounted for a switch to digital projection, but a Kickstarter raised over $84,000 to keep the theater operating. In 2017, it again faced closure when its rent rose, but met its $72,000 goal to stay open. The theater is financially supported by the Crescent Theater Film Society, a nonprofit group.

The theater was ranked the "coolest movie theater" in Alabama by Cosmopolitan.

References

External links
Official website

Cinemas and movie theaters in Alabama
1885 establishments in Alabama
Buildings and structures in Mobile, Alabama
Theatres in Alabama
Theatres completed in 1885
Tourist attractions in Mobile, Alabama